Professional wrestling is a popular sport in India. The country have rich history of professional wrestling. Many professional wrestlers from India wrestled around the world in various promotions.
International wrestling promotion such as WWE, Impact Wrestling generates high television viewership and have significant fan following.

History

In early 20th century The Great Gama was a famous professional wrestler in India.
Dara Singh was a notable pro wrestler from India, who won titles internationally. In 1950s, he won world championship against world famous wrestler Emile Czaja, popularly known by his ring name King Kong. He also defeated world champion wrestler Lou Thesz of the US. Singh participated in almost 500 professional fights and remained undefeated in all of them, he wrestled against George Gordienko of Canada, John da Silva of New Zealand and others. 
In 2018 WWE honoured Dara Singh by inducting in WWE Hall of Fame Legacy. Tiger Joginder Singh, Arjan Singh Das was best professional wrestlers from India, who worked in promotions in Singapore, Japan, USA in 1940s and 1950s.
Gama Singh did wrestling 1970s– 1990s. Jatindra Charan Guho, Tiger Daula were wrestled in first half of 20th century. 

Star Sports and Ten Sports use to air matches of TNA and WWE promotion in the country respectively.

Modern era

Dalip Singh Rana, who is widely known by his ring name The Great Khali became WWE World Heavyweight Champion in 2007. In the 20-man battle royale match, he defeated Batista, Kane and others. At No Mercy 2007 pay-per-view he wrestled against Batista in Punjabi Prison Match. He defeated WWE legends such as The Undertaker, John Cena and Rey Mysterio in his WWE career. On April 7, 2021, WWE honoured The Great Khali by inducting him in WWE Hall of Fame. Thus he became the first professional wrestler from India who got this honour. Presently wrestlers such as Saurav Gurjar, Rinku Singh, and Shanky are in WWE, formerly Satendra Dagar, Lovepreet Sangha, Gaint Zanjeer, Kavita Devi was part of it.After WWE, Khali moved back to India and open a pro wrestling promotion, Continental Wrestling Entertainment (CWE), by which he provide training to the budding wrestlers, organise wrestling events. WWE have been organised some live events in the India so far. CWE academy in Jalandhar, Punjab is made in 3 hector land. It streams its 'Saturday night show' on YouTube. Freak Fighter Wrestling (FFW) of Sampala, Haryana is another wrestling promotion in India. Indian wrestler Sangram Singh was signed with South African promotion, Guru Raaj completes in WWE NXT, Badshah Khan holds CWE title, Satnam Singh and Mahabali Shera signed with All Elite Wrestling and Ohio Valley Wrestling respectively, later one was one time OVW National Heavyweight Champion. 

Wrestle Square, promotion established a pro wrestling school , Jeet Wrestle Square (JWS) academy, with Jeet Rama (Satendra Dagar) in Northern India.  

Due to the popularity of pro wrestling and India's vast market and economic potential, WWE often held tryouts in India to recruit wrestlers and train them at their Performance center in US. 
Presently Sony Ten 1 and Ten Sport 3 channel broadcasts WWE live, exclusively in India. Eurosport television channel airs matches of 
All Elite Wrestling (AEW).

Television shows 
Following list contains TV shows created by multiple foreign wrestling promotions with India's professional wrestlers :

 100% De Dana Dan – It was aired in 2009, it was made by a South African wrestling promotion World wrestling professionals, it was filmed in South Africa. It had matches between South African and Indian wrestlers. It was aired on Colors TV. 
 Ring Ka King – It was a show of Total Non Stop Action (TNA) pramotion. It included foreign and Indian wrestlers. It was aired on Colors TV in India.
 Sunday Dhamaal – It was a weekly wrestling show of Sony Max featuring summary of storylines, matches of WWE in immediate week hosted by Sahil Khattar.
 WWE Superstar Spectacle – In 2021, WWE created a special episode for WWE fans of India, broadcast it on Sony Ten 1 Sony Ten 2 and Sony Max television channels on the occasion of India's Republic day, January 26, 2021. 
 AEW Dynamite and AEW Rampage – the shows of All Elites Wrestling promotion, Eurosport channel run it in India.

Gallery

See also 

 Sport in India
 WWE in India
 List of professional wrestling related articles of India 
 List of Indian professional wrestlers 
 List of Indian male professional wrestlers 
 List of Professional wrestling TV shows in India

Footnotes

References

Professional wrestling in India